Seychelles is the debut studio album by Japanese jazz fusion guitarist Masayoshi Takanaka, released via Kitty Records in July 1976. The album's initial release was distributed via a cassette tape, as was re-released as a CD in 1984. The album is named after the island of Seychelles.

Reception 
According to The Japan Times, Takanaka's debut album Seychelles "helped pioneer Japan's rock-fusion scene". The records tracks are characterized by melodic guitar solos with a slightly tropical vibe.

Track listing 
Seychelles track listing

Personnel 
Credits and personnel adapted from liner notes

 Masayoshi Takanaka – producer, composer, arranger, guitar, percussion, lead vocals 
 Yukihiro Takahashi – lyrics (tracks 1, 2, 6)
 Tsugutoshi Gotō – bass 
 Yosui Inoue – chorus
 Tatsuo Hayashi – drums, percussion 
 Akio Itoh – engineer
 Susumu Ohno – engineer
 Yasunori Kitajima – engineer
 Atsuya Yasumuro – executive producer
 Hiroshi Imai – keyboards
 Tan Tan – lead vocals, chorus 
 Motoya Hamaguchi – percussion
 Nobuo Saitoh – percussion
 Yasuo Azuma – photography
 Jake H. Concepcion – saxophone

Release history

References

External links 

1976 debut albums
Masayoshi Takanaka albums